Malaxis unifolia, or the green adder's-mouth orchid,  is a species of orchid occurring from eastern and central Canada (Newfoundland to Manitoba), the central and eastern United States (Maine to Florida, west as far as Minnesota, eastern Kansas, and eastern Texas), Mexico, Central America and the Greater Antilles (Cuba, Jamaica, Dominican Republic).

Malaxis unifolia generally has only one leaf, but rarely two. Flowers are green, in a raceme, often resembling an umbel at first before it elongates.

References 

unifolia
Orchids of Canada
Orchids of the United States
Orchids of Central America
Flora of the Caribbean
Plants described in 1803
Orchids of Mexico